Rémy Vita (born 1 April 2001) is a French professional footballer who plays as a left-back and wing-back for Eredivisie club Fortuna Sittard.

Career
Vita is a youth product of his local club Alençon, he joined the youth academy of Troyes in 2016. He made his professional debut with Troyes in a 2–0 Ligue 2 win over Le Havre on 24 August 2020.

In October 2020, he signed with German club Bayern Munich II for a €1,500,000 transfer fee on a three-year contract.

In September 2022, Vita joined English club Barnsley on loan for the rest of the season.

Vita was transferred permanently to Eredivisie club Fortuna Sittard on 5 July 2022, for an undisclosed fee, and signed a four-year contract.

International career
Born in France, he was called up to the Madagascar national team for the 2023 Africa Cup of Nations qualification matches against Ghana and Angola on 1 and 5 June 2022.

Personal life
Vita was born in France and is of Malagasy descent. He is eligible to represent either his birth nation and Madagascar as well.

Career statistics

References

External links
 

2001 births
Footballers from Normandy
Sportspeople from Alençon
French sportspeople of Malagasy descent
Living people
French footballers
Malagasy footballers
Association football fullbacks
US Alençon players
ES Troyes AC players
FC Bayern Munich II players
Barnsley F.C. players
Ligue 2 players
Championnat National 3 players
Regionalliga players
3. Liga players
English Football League players
French expatriate footballers
French expatriate sportspeople in Germany
Malagasy expatriate footballers
Malagasy expatriate sportspeople in Germany
Expatriate footballers in Germany
French expatriate sportspeople in England
Expatriate footballers in England
Malagasy expatriate sportspeople in England
French expatriate sportspeople in the Netherlands
Expatriate footballers in the Netherlands
Malagasy expatriate sportspeople in the Netherlands